Luceafărul Stadium is a multi-use stadium in Sânmartin, Romania. It is currently used mostly for football matches and is the home ground of Luceafărul Oradea. The stadium holds 2,200 people.

Gallery

Football venues in Romania
Oradea
Sport in Oradea
CS Luceafărul Oradea